The Short S.11 Valetta was a 1930s British passenger monoplane designed and built by Short Brothers at Rochester.

Development
The Valetta was designed and built for the Air Ministry to enable comparisons between a floatplane/landplane and a flying boat. The Valetta was a monoplane powered by three Bristol Jupiter XIF engines and first flown on 21 May 1930 as a floatplane. It had room for two crew and 16 passengers. In July 1931 it left Rochester on an African survey flight flown by Sir Alan Cobham, it returned to Rochester in September 1931 after flying 12,300 miles. The aircraft last flew as a floatplane in November 1931 and was converted to a landplane. It then underwent trials with Imperial Airways and the Air Ministry before being withdrawn from use and used by the Royal Air Force as an instructional aircraft at RAF Halton.

Short Valetta (Floatplane)

Short Valetta (landplane)

See also

References

External links

A flight in the Short "Valetta", Flight, 3 October 1930

1930s British airliners
Floatplanes
Valetta
Trimotors
High-wing aircraft
Aircraft first flown in 1930